Hepburn is an unincorporated community in northern Dudley Township, Hardin County, Ohio, United States. Along the south side of the community runs the Scioto River. The community is served by the Kenton (43326) post office.

History
Hepburn was laid out in 1882. A post office was established at Hepburn in 1884, and remained in operation until 1948.

References

Unincorporated communities in Hardin County, Ohio
1882 establishments in Ohio
Populated places established in 1882
Unincorporated communities in Ohio